Branko Okić (born February 16, 1969) is a Bosnian-Herzegovinian retired footballer

Playing career

Club
Okić spent the majority of his career in the German lower leagues.

Managerial career
After coaching German amateur side SV Ebnat, TuRa Untermünkheim and DJK Schwabsberg, he was appointed assistant to head coach Bruno Akrapović at Bulgarian giants CSKA Sofia in November 2011.

References

1969 births
Living people
People from Kreševo
Association football midfielders
Bosnia and Herzegovina footballers
FK Sarajevo players
VfR Aalen players
FC Rot-Weiß Erfurt players
1. FC Heidenheim players
Regionalliga players
3. Liga players
Bosnia and Herzegovina expatriate footballers
Expatriate footballers in Germany
Bosnia and Herzegovina expatriate sportspeople in Germany